Journey Back to Youth (Puteshestvie v yunost) is a 2001 documentary film by  Russian film makers Alexander Gutman and Sergei Litviakov. The film is an interview of four German women who tell the story of four young German girls from East Prussia placed into a Soviet labor camp at the end of World War II according to Stalin's decisions about mobilization of Germans for reconstruction works in the USSR.

The film won the Platinum Award at the 34th International Independent Film Festival (Worldfest) in Houston, Texas, in 2001 and the "Gold Camera Award" at the US International Film and Video Festival in 2001.

Film history
The film maker, Gutman, said that he got the idea for the film when he learned that the Heinrich Böll Foundation funded a monument in Petrozavodsk, Karelia at the graveyard of German women who died in the local GULAG camp.

References

2001 films
Documentary films about the Gulag
Russian documentary films
2001 documentary films